Prodosia is an album by the Greek singer Mando. It was released in Greece in November 1998 by Sony Music Greece. It is her 9th album.

Track listing
 "Prodosia"
 "Ti Mou' Xeis Kanei"
 "Erotas Dilitirio"
 "Fotia Sta Prepi"
 "Pyreto Fotia Ke Zali"
 "Ola Ta Rologia"
 "Simera"
 "Nyhta Min Erhese"
 "Matia Pagovouna"
 "Agapi Se Vaftisa"
 "Ela Feggari Mou"
 "Vresta Me Sena"
 "Fthinoporines Psihales"
 "Pos Zis" (Allah Görür)
 "Mia Nyxta Agrypnias"

 Track 15 appeared only in the first pressings of the album and was later removed.

References

1998 albums
Greek-language albums
Mando (singer) albums
Sony Music Greece albums